The Ahrgau (also Argau) was a medieval Frankish gau that lay either side of the River Ahr in the north of the present-day German state of Rhineland-Palatinate, but also reached the gates of Bonn (the Kottenforst forest still belonged to the Ahrgau), especially after the dissolution of the Odangau.

The Ahrgau is mentioned in the records under various names including Arisco (880), pagus Aroensis (882), Argowe (1064) and Archgouwe (1065).

Territory 
The Ahrgau belonged to Ripuaria in Lower Lorraine and to the diocese of the  Archbishopric of Cologne, which had an Ahr deanery (Ahrdekanat or Decanatus Areuensis) named after it.

In the south the Ahrgau bordered on the Mayenfeldgau on the line from Rheineck up the Vinxtbach stream to the Hohe Acht; in the west it bordered on the Eifelgau and Zülpichgau along the Adenaubach stream as far as the Ahr, along the Vischbach, the Sürsch and the Swist; in the north it bordered on the Bonngau; in the east the Rhine separated the Ahrgau from the Auelgau.

Gaugraves 
The gaugraves (Gaugrafen) of Ahrgau mentioned in the records were:
 Sigbod, or Sybodo, (fl. 930), founder of Steinfeld Abbey
 Sicco, (fl. 1064)
 Pertold, also Bertoldus, (fl. 1065)
 Sicco, (fl. 1074)

The gaugraves of Ahrgau were the ancestors of the counts of Are.

Gaugrave Sicco, mentioned in 1074, is supposed to have been the father of Dietrich I of Are.

Literature 
 Geschichtlicher Atlas der Rheinlande, 7th issue, IV.9: Die mittelalterlichen Gaue, 2000, 1 map sheet, 1 enclosure, revised by Thomas Bauer,

References 
 

Carolingian counties
History of the Palatinate (region)
Eifel in the Middle Ages
History of the Rhineland
Ahr